Tselinny District is the name of several administrative and municipal districts in Russia. The name is generally derived from, or is related to, the root "tselina" ("virgin lands").
Tselinny District, Altai Krai, an administrative and municipal district of Altai Krai
Tselinny District, Republic of Kalmykia, an administrative and municipal district of the Republic of Kalmykia
Tselinny District, Kurgan Oblast, an administrative and municipal district of Kurgan Oblast

See also
Tselinny (disambiguation)

References